The 2019–20 SMU Mustangs men's basketball team represented Southern Methodist University during the 2019–20 NCAA Division I men's basketball season. The Mustangs were led by fourth-year head coach Tim Jankovich and played their home games at Moody Coliseum on their campus in University Park, Texas as members of the American Athletic Conference.

Previous season
The Mustangs finished the 2018–19 season 15–17, 6–12 in AAC play to finish in a tie for ninth place. In the AAC tournament, they defeated Tulsa before losing to Cincinnati in the quarterfinals.

Offseason

Departures

Incoming transfers

2019 recruiting class

Roster

Schedule and results

|-
!colspan=12 style=| Regular season

|-
!colspan=9 style=| AAC tournament

1.Cancelled due to the Coronavirus Pandemic

Awards and honors

American Athletic Conference honors

All-AAC Third Team
Kendric Davis
Tyson Jolly
Isiaha Mike

Source

References

SMU Mustangs men's basketball seasons
Smu